The 1952–53 Sussex County Football League season was the 28th in the history of the competition.

The league increased to two Divisions, Division 1 and Division 2. Division 1 featured thirteen of last seasons teams with Whitehawk & Manor Farm Old Boys joining the league. Division 2 featured twelve teams from which the winners would be promoted into Division 1.

Division One
The division featured 14 clubs, 13 which competed in the last season, along with one new club:
 Whitehawk & Manor Farm Old Boys

League table

Division Two
The division featured 12 clubs.

League table

References

1952-53
9